Roland Dalhäuser (born 12 June 1958 in Birsfelden, Basel-Country) is a retired high jumper from Switzerland. He won three medals at the European Indoor Championships and became Swiss champion nine times.

His personal best jump, which is also the Swiss record, is 2.31 metres. He jumped 2.32 metres on the indoor track.

International competitions

1No mark in the final

References

1958 births
Living people
Swiss male high jumpers
Athletes (track and field) at the 1980 Summer Olympics
Athletes (track and field) at the 1984 Summer Olympics
Olympic athletes of Switzerland
Sportspeople from Basel-Landschaft